Bidar taluka is one of the eight talukas of Bidar district. Its administrative headquarters is in the town of Bidar, along with the district's headquarters. The major river is the Manjira which forms the northern border of the taluka. Irrigation is 52% from dug wells, 44% from bore holes, and the rest from is mostly from tanks (reservoir ponds) and lift irrigation from the Manjira.

List of Villages in Bidar district

Notes and references

Geography of Bidar district
Taluks of Karnataka